Sergei Lvovich Krylov (born August 25, 1961 in Tula, RSFSR, USSR) is a Russian singer, showman and actor.

Early life 
He was born in the city of Tula, August 25, 1961 into the family of Valentina (1941–2004) and Lev Krylov (1938–1984). His mother was killed by robbers in July 2004, together with his stepfather Alexey Dmitrievich Tarkhanov (1926–2004). His mother worked all her life at an arms factory. His stepfather was a veteran of the war. Sergei helped him financially to have surgery for throat cancer.

In 1977 he graduated from music school. In 1978 he graduated from high school № 49 of Tula. From 1981–1985 he studied in the Yaroslavl theatrical institute. In 1986 he became a member of the All-Union Studio SPM "Record" (Moscow).

Career 
In March 1987, he recorded a solo album of 11 songs called The Illusion of Life.

His first performance came on April 1, 1987 at the celebration of the Day of laughter. It was the debut in October of Morning mail with Black Sea.

In 1989 he joined Valery Leontiev and his group "Echo" on a trip to India and where they made a concert film Made in India.

In 1992 Krylov appeared in the role of Ostap Bender in the movie Vasily Pichul's Idiot Dreams.

In 1994, he carried out the project "Angel 421" in which Krylov acted as an intermediary between the sponsor and the representative of Russia (Masha Katz – Youddiph) at the 39th Eurovision contest in Dublin, offsetting the sponsor costs in the amount of $100,000 from his personal funds and recorded an album of songs based on poems by Alexander Dobronravov and Victor Pelenyagre.

The show Angel 421 was shown in Samara, Tula, Saratov and Togliatti.

In early 1994 he released the album Port Said with his greatest hits from 1988 to 1993, yielding a gold album. In November 1995, Krylov gave a solo concert at New York concert hall Manhattan Center Studios.

In December 1996 – January 1997, he recorded a 12-song album Monsieur Vysotsky, return to us, dedicated to the 60th anniversary of Vladimir Vysotsky. The songs are written in the style of urban romance. One of them – the song of Vladimir Vysotsky. Kharkov cult group Raznye Lyudi took part in the recording of the album.

In 2008, the leadership of the Sochi Winter Theater proposed to create a theatrical performance based on the movie The Diamond Arm. Krylov agreed. However, due to the financial crisis this project was suspended. Krylov planned to portray Lyolik (Anatoly Papanov's character), but, according to him, would have gladly shared this role, "if one of his star colleagues will want to play this character".

He participated in the reality show Last Hero and the program You superstar!.

Personal life 
He married Larisa Makarova, with whom he had daughter Karolina (born January 31, 1980). Later he married Lyubov Dubovik, with whom he had son Yan (born November 5, 1992).

Discography 
1987 –  The Illusion of Life 
1988 – The Sea
1994 – Port Said 
1994 – Angel 421
1994 – Yoksel-mokselan (children's songs)
1997 – Monsieur Vysotsky, return to us
2003 – It's okay

Filmography 
Bursa (1990)
 Gangsters in the Ocean (1992)
 Fictitious Marriage (1992)
Idiot Dreams (1993) as Ostap Bender
 Black Room (TV, 2000) as porter
 Egor's Mountain (2008) as bank representative
 Big Difference (2008) as cameo

Awards 
 Lomonosov Order (August 25, 2006) – for outstanding achievements in the social, cultural, social and charitable activities in the field of art

References

External links
 
 Интервью Сергея Крылова для Nomobile.ru, беседовал Константин Криницкий
 Сергей Львович КРЫЛОВ биография
 Профиль на сайте футбольного клуба звёзд эстрады «Старко»
 Биография

1961 births
Living people
People from Tula, Russia
Russian male actors
Russian pop singers
Russian television presenters
Soviet male actors
Soviet pop singers